The women's discus throw event at the 2009 Summer Universiade was held on 7–8 July.

Medalists

Results

Qualification
Qualification: 56.00 m (Q) or at least 12 best (q) qualified for the final.

Final

References
Results (archived)

Discus
2009 in women's athletics
2009